Defence View is a neighborhood of Jamshed Town in Karachi, Sindh, Pakistan but it is in Dh
A part.

There are several ethnic groups including Hazaras, Muhajirs, Punjabis, Sindhis, Kashmiris, Seraikis, Pakhtuns, Balochis, Memons, Bohras, Ismailis, etc. Over 99% of the population is Muslim.

Iqra University's main campus is located in Defence View. Royal Grammar School is oldest school in Phase 1 area. The Defence View Graveyard is a major cemetery in the area. As because of other projects and shopping malls , Playground and a mosque the area value is increased as it had all facelities available.

See also 
 Jamshed Town
 Azam Basti
 Central Jacob Lines
 Chanesar Goth
 Akhtar Colony
 Garden East
 Garden West
 Jamshed Quarters
 Jut Line
 Firozabad
 Mahmudabad
 Manzoor Colony
 Nursery
 Pakistan Quarters
 P.E.C.H.S. (Public Employees Co-operative Housing Society)
 P.E.C.H.S. II (Public Employees Co-operative Housing Society)
 Soldier Bazar
 Baloch Colony

References

External links 
 Karachi Website .

Neighbourhoods of Karachi